The 1936 Birmingham Erdington by-election was held on 20 October 1936.  The by-election was held due to the death of the incumbent Conservative MP, John Eales.  It was won by the Conservative candidate John Wright.

References

1936 in England
1936 elections in the United Kingdom
Erdington
1930s in Birmingham, West Midlands